LMSC can be an abbreviation for:

LAN/MAN Standards Committee, the body which defined IEEE 802
Licensed Marine Store Collector, once an Australian dealer in recyclable goods - see Container deposit legislation in Australia
Lockheed Missiles and Space Company a large US business
Port Lincoln Marine Science Centre, a South Australian research and teaching establishment
Local Media Services Company, a West Australian television broadcast production company